Juliana Machado (born 6 November 1994) is an Angolan handball player for Primeiro de Agosto. She is a member of the Angolan national team.

She competed at the 2015 World Women's Handball Championship in Denmark and at the 2016 Summer Olympics.

Achievements 
Carpathian Trophy:
Winner: 2019

References

External links

1994 births
Living people
Angolan female handball players
Olympic handball players of Angola
Handball players at the 2016 Summer Olympics
Handball players from Luanda
Expatriate handball players
Angolan expatriate sportspeople in Spain
Competitors at the 2019 African Games
African Games competitors for Angola
Handball players at the 2020 Summer Olympics
African Games medalists in handball
African Games gold medalists for Angola